Mill Branch is a  long second-order tributary to Marshyhope Creek in Dorchester County, Maryland.

Course

Watershed
Mill Branch drains  of area, receives about 44.3 in/year of precipitation and is about 18.57% forested.

See also
List of Maryland rivers

References

Rivers of Maryland
Rivers of Dorchester County, Maryland
Tributaries of the Nanticoke River